margareta waterman (lowercase intentional) (born December 8, 1932) is an American poet and publisher. She founded the small press nine muses books in Seattle, Washington in 1987, and has since published upwards of 70 books and chapbooks by poets, improvisational musicians, and other writers from the Pacific Northwest. nine muses books is listed in The Directory of Poetry Publishers, 30th edition. More than two dozen books of waterman's poems and short stories have been published. Her work references mythology and the female experience. Waterman did not begin publicly performing her work or publishing until she was in her 50s.

In Seattle, waterman was affiliated with the Seattle Muse Community and served on the board of the Red Sky Poetry Theatre from 1989-1994. She founded manifest arts, a series of poetry and performance art videos originally broadcast on TCI. manifest arts documented work by Charlie Burks, Louise Dovell, Martina Goodin, Bill Shively, Carletta Wilson, Marion Kimes, Michael Hureaux, Thomas R Prince, and David Lloyd Whited from 1989-1990.

Personal life
waterman was born in Boston, Massachusetts and was raised in New York City. Her mother was a French (and later music) teacher, and her father was a sports journalist. Both parents were involved in labor organizing. waterman attended New York public schools before attending Connecticut College, Hunter College, and Williams College. waterman was married to Kenneth Moore from 1951-1957, Lewis Murdock from 1957-1982, and has three children, Cynthia, Pamela, and Roderick. She brought her family west in 1969 to join a commune in Southern Oregon. In 1986, she moved to Seattle and began to collaborate with musicians, dancers, painters, and sculptors. She did an extensive reading tour of the United States and Canada from 1994-1998. She has traveled extensively and lived in Greece, India, Australia, Africa, China, Tibet, and various countries in South America.

Selected works

the seed of osiris, nine muses books, 1987
eleusinian theatre, nine muses books, 1988
red sky sketches, nine muses books, 1988
moon riding backwards, nine muses books, 1989
lady orpheus, nine muses books, 1990
cracked crystal, nine muses books, 1991
egyptian night, nine muses books, 1991
walkin' occam's razor, nine muses books, 1991
lady orpheus, nine muses books, 1993
astarte calling clytemnestra, nine muses books, 1994
some south american colors, nine muses books, 1995
five songs from the primordial alphabet, nine muses books, 1996
cloud coop songs, 26 BOOKS, 1997
the mother of the world, nine muses books, 1999
loose ends, nine muses books, 2000
the lion throne, nine muses books, 2002
pending visions, nine muses books, 2003
now and other times, nine muses books, 2003
iteration, nine muses books, 2005
the sexuality of ageing, nine muses books, 2009
achilles and helen, nine muses books, 2013
the voice of lysergic acid, nine muses books, 2013

References

External links
nine muses books
margareta waterman page on Oregon Poetic Voices
Oregon Arts Commission
Interview with margareta waterman on Vispo.com

1932 births
American women poets
Living people
20th-century American poets
20th-century American women writers
21st-century American women